The 1980 Summer Olympics torch relay was run from June 19, 1980 until July 19, 1980 prior to the 1980 Summer Olympics in Moscow. Sergei Belov lit the cauldron at the opening ceremony.

Route

References

External links
IOC website for 1980 torch relay

Torch Relay, 1980 Summer Olympics
Olympic torch relays